Rewire: Digital Cosmopolitans in the Age of Connection is a 2013 nonfiction book about contemporary globalization and xenophilia by American blogger Ethan Zuckerman of MIT. It describes homophilic barriers to cosmopolitanism such as filter bubbles and media bias. Zuckerman calls for a strenuously internationalized media and cultural literacy empowered by language translation. He cites the work of scholars Kwame Anthony Appiah, Ronald Stuart Burt, Mark Granovetter, and Robert D. Putnam, and of cosmopolitan exemplars Matt Harding, Erik Hersman, Dhani Jones, Roland Soong, Global Voices Online, Härnu, Meedan, and Tea Leaf Nation.

See also
 Machine translation
 Computer-assisted translation
 Parachute journalism
 Third culture kid

References

Further reading
Reviews

External links
 W.W. Norton. Rewire

2013 non-fiction books
American non-fiction books
Books about globalization
W. W. Norton & Company books
Cosmopolitanism